Philippe Coulon (born 27 February 1950) is a Swiss former Grand Prix motorcycle road racer from Switzerland. His best year was in 1976 when he finished in sixth place in the 500cc world championship.

References 

1950 births
Living people
Swiss motorcycle racers
350cc World Championship riders
500cc World Championship riders
Place of birth missing (living people)